"Going in Circles" is a song written by Jerry Peters and Anita Poree, and originally performed by The Friends of Distinction on their 1969 album Grazin', reaching number 15 on the U.S. Hot 100, and number three on the R&B chart. The song has since been covered numerous times by other artists, including Isaac Hayes and Luther Vandross.  In addition, the song's co-composer, Jerry Peters released his own version of the tune on his 1972 solo album Blueprint for Discovery. The Friends of Distinction's original version is an R.I.A.A. Certified Million-Seller.

Chart history

Weekly charts

Year-end charts

Cover versions
 Dwight T. Ross (1968). Sampled in "ManyFacedGod" by Jay-Z featuring James Blake from his album 4:44.
 Carolyn Franklin, on Chain Reaction (1970)
 Isaac Hayes, on Black Moses (1971)
 The Gap Band, on Gap Band VII (1985)
 Maceo Parker, on Funk Overload (1998)
 Crime Mob, on "Circles" (2007)

Luther Vandross version

Several cover versions have been done; the most popularized version is R&B/soul singer Luther Vandross' cover. Vandross recorded a version that appears on his 1994 standards album Songs. In 1995, his cover version was released as the B-side single to "Love The One You're With". The song received heavy radio-rotation and became a top thirty hit on both ''Billboard's 'Hot R&B Singles' and 'Hot Adult Contemporary Songs'.

Track list
US CD Single
"Going In Circles" (Radio Edit) - 4:00
"Going In Circles" (Album Version) - 5:12
"Going In Circles" (Instrumental) - 4:00
"Love The One You're With" (Edit) - 3:43
"Love The One You're With" (Remix Edit) - 3:59

Charts

References

External links
 
 

1969 songs
1969 singles
1994 singles
The Friends of Distinction songs
The Gap Band songs
Isaac Hayes songs
Luther Vandross songs
Songs written by Jerry Peters
Songs written by Anita Poree
RCA Records singles
1960s ballads
Rhythm and blues ballads
Soul ballads